Jennifer Schultz (born 1971/72) is a Minnesota politician and former member of the Minnesota House of Representatives. A member of the Minnesota Democratic–Farmer–Labor Party (DFL), she formerly represented District 7A in northeastern Minnesota.

Early life and education
Schultz was raised in Chippewa Falls, Wisconsin. She attended the University of Wisconsin–Eau Claire, graduating with a bachelor's degree in political science; Washington State University, graduating with an M.A. in economics; and the University of Minnesota, graduating with a Ph.D. in health services research, policy, and administration, with a concentration in health economics.

Personal life
Schultz is married to Rob Weidner. They have two children and reside in Duluth, Minnesota. She is a professor of health care economics at the University of Minnesota Duluth.

Congressional campaign
On March 28, 2022, Schultz announced that she was running for Congress in Minnesota's 8th congressional district. She won the August 9 DFL primary with 86.15% of the vote, and lost the November 8 general election by almost 14.5%.

References

External links
Rep. Jennifer Schultz legislative website
Jennifer Schultz for Congress campaign website

1970s births
21st-century American politicians
21st-century American women politicians
Candidates in the 2022 United States House of Representatives elections
Living people
Politicians from Chippewa Falls, Wisconsin
Politicians from Duluth, Minnesota
University of Wisconsin–Eau Claire alumni
Washington State University alumni
University of Minnesota alumni
University of Minnesota Duluth faculty
Democratic Party members of the Minnesota House of Representatives
Women state legislators in Minnesota